A social machine is an environment comprising humans and technology interacting and producing outputs or action which would not be possible without both parties present.

The growth of social machines has been greatly enabled by technologies such as the Internet, the smartphone, social media and the World Wide Web, by connecting people in new ways.

Concept
The idea of social machines has been around for a long time, discussed as early as 1846 by Captain William Allen, and also by authors such as Norman Mailer, Gilles Deleuze and Félix Guattari.

Social machines blur the lines between computational processes and input from humans. They often take the form of collaborative online projects which produce web content, such as Wikipedia, citizen science projects like Galaxy Zoo, and even social networking site such as Twitter have also been defined as social machines. However, a social machine does not necessarily produce outcomes which directly affect the individuals or machines involved and an alternative viewpoint states that Social Machines are "rather than being an intentionally engineered piece of software - the substrate of accumulated human cross-system information sharing activities".

Nigel Shadbolt et al. say that the telos of the social machine is specific to its participants, whereas the telos of a platform is independent of its participants’ purposes; the platform is there to facilitate communication. A social machine may also spread across more than one platform, depending on how its participants interact, while a platform like Twitter could host many thousands of social machines.

An academic field investigating the idea has been active since Tim Berners-Lee's book Weaving the web. Social machines are characterised as 'social systems on the Web ... computational entities governed by both computational and social processes'. Tim Berners-Lee and James Hendler expressed some of the underlying scientific challenges with respect to AI research using semantic web technology as a point of departure.

Recent work focuses on the idea that certain social machines can be regarded as autonomous and goal-driven agents, and should be analysed and regulated as such.  Nello Cristianini and Teresa Scantamburlo argued that the combination of a human society and an algorithmic regulation forms a social machine.

See also
Augmented intelligence
Crowdsourcing
Government by algorithm
Human-based computation
Internet of things
Social computing
Social software
Social technology

References

Further reading

James Hendler and Alice Mulvehill (2016), Social Machines: The Coming Collision of Artificial Intelligence, Social Networking, and Humanity, Apress,

External links
SOCIAM: The Theory and Practice of Social Machines — slide show
Observing Social Machines Part 1: What to Observe — pre-print

 
Government by algorithm